Valaire, formerly known as Misteur Valaire, are a French Canadian electropop group based in Sherbrooke, Quebec and later Montreal.

History
The five members of Misteur Valaire met in elementary school. They all had classic jazz musical training before becoming interested in electronic music. In CEGEP, in 2003, the group participated in the local Vocational Schools Final performing at Cégep de Sherbrooke. They formed the band Misteur Valaire in 2005, and recorded an album, Mr. Brian. A second album, Friterday Night was released in 2007.

Misteur Valaire performed regularly in Montreal and toured around Quebec. The band released an album, Golden Bombay in 2010, with several guest singers. The album was a longlisted nominee for the 2010 Polaris Music Prize, and the band were shortlisted for the Juno Award for New Group of the Year at the Juno Awards of 2011.

In 2013 the band release an album, Bellevue. By 2016 the band had changed its name to Valaire.

In 2018 Valaire performed at the Emerging Music Festival in Abitibi-Témiscamingue, and also released a video for their single "The Coast".

Discography

Studio albums
 Mr. Brian, 2005, CD, Music download,  Mr. Label, 8+1 tracks
 Friterday Night, 2007, CD, Music download, Mr. Label, 11 tracks
 Golden Bombay, 2010, CD, LP, Music download, Mr. Label, 11 tracks
 Bellevue, 2013, CD, LP, Music download, Mr. Label, 11+1 tracks
 Oobopopop, 2016, CD, LP, Music download

Live albums
 Misteur Valaire Live @ Montreal, 2012, Music download, Mr. Label, 12 tracks

References

Canadian pop music groups
Musical groups from Sherbrooke
Canadian electronic music groups
Musical groups established in 2005
2005 establishments in Quebec